Anloo is a village in the Dutch province of Drenthe. It is a part of the municipality of Aa en Hunze, and lies about 10 km east of Assen.

History 
The village was first mentioned in 1139 as Anloe. The etymology in unclear. Anloo is an esdorp which developed in the Early Middle Ages on the Hondsrug. The village has two brinks (village squares). The eastern square contains the church on an elevated position. The western square is elongated and contained the former havezate (manor house) Elentsborg which was demolished in 1838.

The Magnus Church dates from around 1100 and was a replacement of a wooden church. It was extended several times during its history. The spire of the tower 1757. The church was restored between 1941 and 1944. There are wall paintings about the life of Mary, mother of Jesus which have been made around 1300. During the Middle Ages, the church also served as court house.

Anloo was home to 277 people in 1840. During World War II, there was a submerged hut in the forest where people could shelter. The hut was discovered on 29 September 1944. Of the eight onderduikers (people in hiding), three were captured and executed at Westerbork transit camp; the others managed to escape. On 8 April 1945, three days before liberation, ten members of the Dutch Resistance were executed at the hut. The resistance members were held captive at Scholtenhuis in Groningen by the Sicherheitsdienst. On 10 April, their bodies were discovered by a passer-by. In 1970, a monument was revealed at the hut for the victims.

Until 1998, Anloo was a separate municipality, however the town hall was located in Annen. In 1998, it was merged into Aa en Hunze.

Hunebedden 
There are four hunebedden (dolmen) around Anloo. 

The hunebed  is hidden in the forest and on a military terrain. It consists of four capstones, however one has fallen. A large part of the dolmen is still hidden under ground.

The hunebed  is located in the forest and contains four capstones and eight side stones. One gate stone has remained. The missing gate stone has been marked by a concrete cast.

The hunebed  is a small incomplete dolmen near the main road in the build-up area.

The hunebed  is located on the estate Terborgh. It is medium sized with four capstones, however it is well preserved and only one capstone was removed. Some artefacts from the cellar have been recovered in 1879, and are on display in the British Museum, however the dolmen has not been scientifically researched yet. It was restored in 1951.

Nature 
Anloo is surrounded by forests. It is an archaeological reserve, due to the presence of dolmen, and many ancient burial mounts.

Transportation
There is no railway station in Anloo. The nearest station is Assen railway station. Bus service 58 runs through Anloo and goes to Assen railway station.

For further information see Aa en Hunze#Transportation.

Notable people 
 Harm Brouwer (born 1957), politician

Gallery

References

Municipalities of the Netherlands disestablished in 1998
Former municipalities of Drenthe
Populated places in Drenthe
Aa en Hunze